Stenaelurillus zambiensis is  a species of jumping spider in the genus Stenaelurillus that lives in Malawi, Zambia and Zimbabwe. It was first described in 2014 by Wanda Wesołowska. The male has a distinctive metallic sheen on its abdomen and eye field. The male carapace is marked with two white streaks while the female has white stripes. It is distinguished from other members of the genus by the male's hook-shaped end to the embolus and the two depressions in the female epigyne.

Taxonomy
Stenaelurillus zambiensis was first described by Wanda Wesołowska in 2014. It is one of over 500 species identified by the Polish arachnologist. The genus Stenaelurillus was first raised by Eugène Simon in 1885. The name relates to the genus name Aelurillus, which itself derives from the Greek word for cat, with the addition of a Greek stem meaning narrow. In 2017, it was grouped with nine other genera of jumping spiders under the name Aelurillines. It has been placed in the subtribe Aelurillina in the tribe Aelurillini in the clade Saltafresia. The species name derives from the place where it was first found, Zambia.

Description
The spider is typical of its genus. It has a brown pear-shaped carapace covered in dense brown hairs with a pair of white streaks. The eye field is black, while the legs are brown. The abdomen and eye field both have a distinctive metallic feel. The spider has yellowish grey pedipalps and a round palpal bulb. The shape of the abdomen differs from other species of Stenaelurillus, which are typically oblong, but it is most distinctive feature is the hook-shaped end to its and straight embolus.

The carapace has a pair of white stripes and both the abdomen and eye field lack a metallic look. The epigyne has two large rounded depressions, which distinguishes it from other spiders.

Distribution
The distribution covers Malawi, Zambia and Zimbabwe. The holotype for the species was found near Mfuwe, Zambia in 1995. The spider has also identified from samples taken from the Mana Pools National Park, Zimbabwe, and the Nature Reserve at Lilongwe, Malawi.

References

Citations

Bibliography

Arthropods of Malawi
Arthropods of Zimbabwe
Invertebrates of Zambia
Salticidae
Spiders described in 2014
Spiders of Africa
Taxa named by Wanda Wesołowska